The New Age is a 1994 comedy-drama film written and directed by Michael Tolkin, and starring Peter Weller and Judy Davis.

Plot 
Peter and Katherine Witner are Southern California super-yuppies with great jobs but no center to their lives. When they both lose their jobs and begin marital infidelities, their solution is to start their own business together. In order to find meaning to their empty lives, they follow various New Age gurus and other such groups. Eventually, they hit rock bottom and have to make some hard decisions.

Cast 
 Peter Weller as Peter Witner
 Judy Davis as Katherine Witner
 Patrick Bauchau as Jean Levy
 Rachel Rosenthal as Sarah Friedberg
 Adam West as Jeff Witner
 Paula Marshall as Alison Gale
 Bruce Ramsay as Misha
 Tanya Pohlkotte as Bettina
 Susan Traylor as Ellen Saltonstall
 Patricia Heaton as Anna
 John Diehl as Lyle
 Maureen Mueller as Laura
 Sandra Seacat as Mary Netter
 Samuel L. Jackson as Dale Deveaux
 Audra Lindley as Sandi Rego
 Corbin Bernsen as Kevin Bulasky
 Jonathan Hadary as Paul Hartmann
 Lily Mariye as Sue
 Kimberley Kates as Other Catherine
 Maria Ellingsen as Hilly
 Kelly Miracco as Carol (as Kelly Miller)
 Dana Hollowell as Emily
 Rebecca Staab as Woman Customer
 Mary Kane as Tina Bulasky
 Patrick Dollaghan as Chet
 Jeff Celentano as Tab (as Jeff Weston)
 Victoria Baker as Victoria
 Bob Flanagan as himself
 Nicole Nagel as Rich German
 Dana Kaminski as Andrea

Release
The film opened on September 16, 1994 in New York (Village East Cinema and Sony Tower East) and Los Angeles, and grossed $35,797 for the weekend. It expanded to 12 screens and grossed a total of $245,217.

Reception 
The film holds a rating of 64% on Rotten Tomatoes based on 14 reviews.

Year-end lists 
 5th – Peter Rainer, Los Angeles Times
9th - Roger Ebert, Chicago Sun-Times
 Honorable mention – Jeff Simon, The Buffalo News

References

External links 
 
 
 
 

1994 comedy-drama films
1994 films
Films scored by Mark Mothersbaugh
Films directed by Michael Tolkin
Films with screenplays by Michael Tolkin
Warner Bros. films
Regency Enterprises films
1990s English-language films
New Age in popular culture